James Richard Lawrence (born 4, May 1946) is a former American football coach. He served as the head football coach at Oklahoma Panhandle State University in Goodwell, Oklahoma from 1981 to 1982, leading the Aggies to their first ever NAIA playoff appearance in 1981.  From 1986 to 1992, Lawrence served as the head coach of the University of Wisconsin–Stout, compiling a record of 23–47–1.

Head coaching record

College football

References

1946 births
Living people
Chadron State Eagles football players
Oklahoma Panhandle State Aggies athletic directors
Oklahoma Panhandle State Aggies football coaches
Upper Iowa Peacocks football coaches
Upper Iowa Peacocks football players
Wisconsin–Stout Blue Devils football coaches
Wyoming Cowboys football coaches
High school football coaches in Iowa
People from Johnson County, Wyoming
Players of American football from Wyoming